Skai TV (Greek: ΣΚΑΪ) is a Greek free-to-air television network based in Piraeus. It is part of the Skai Group, one of the largest media groups in the country. It was relaunched in its present form on 1 April 2006 in the Athens metropolitan area, and gradually spread its coverage nationwide. Besides digital terrestrial transmission, it is available on the subscription-based encrypted services of Nova and Cosmote TV.

Skai TV is also a member of Digea, a consortium of private television networks introducing digital terrestrial transmission in Greece. At launch, Skai TV opted for dubbing all foreign language content into Greek, instead of using subtitles. This is very uncommon in Greece for anything except documentaries and children's programs, so after intense criticism, the station switched to using subtitles for almost all foreign shows.

History
Skai TV was first launched on 21 September 1993 with an emphasis on news and sports. However, on 26 September 1999, it was sold and the new owners gradually rebranded it as Alpha TV. The new station had an entirely different programming perspective and opted for a more mainstream profile. It soon became one of the top three TV stations in Greece.

On 1 April 2006, the company that originally launched Skai TV bought Seven TV, a holder of a Greek National broadcasting license that failed to expand its coverage all over the country or attract a wide audience. The station was renamed to 'Skai TV' allowing the brand to re-emerge on the Greek television scene after 7 years, but this time the owners decided to forgo their previous approach and opted for foreign shows and news coverage. On 6 September 2007, Skai TV was added to the lineup of NOVA Greece digital platform. On 2 March 2016, Skai TV launched its own high-definition feed. On 2 September, the network won one of four national television licenses auctioned in Greece after Iannis Alafouzos paid €43.6 million in a highly unusual competitive bidding process.

Criticism

Skai TV was heavily criticized for its "yellow press" news coverage and low-budget programming. In an incident still remembered by Greek viewers and later investigated by a Channel 4 documentary, the station was unanimously slated for its involvement (and live coverage) of a hostage situation that ended with the death of the victim. Skai TV has been criticized by Greek socialists for allegedly promoting right-wing politics, liberal and pro-EU politics in its news reporting and political commentary, and for being essentially the mouthpiece of big business in Greece. It has also been criticized by some Greek conservative commentators for its political documentaries. Statements by various journalists of the channel such as Aris Portosalte have evoked criticism, while it has been also criticised for portraying the Mitsotakis cabinet with a very positive point of view.

Technology
Skai TV has made an appearance in international airwaves, being the first non-subscription TV station worldwide to use solely digital technology thus being completely tapeless. It uses the SONAPS network broadcast system made by Sony and installed by British company VSC Design. Skai also uses Harmonic Spectrum servers for Playout together with IBIS automation.

Skai TV is also the first station in Greece to broadcast its full program in 16:9 format.

Programming
Skai TV has a focus on entertainment and information. Programming includes comedies, dramas, current affairs shows, documentaries, and sports.

Foreign programs originally made up the bulk of Skai TV's schedule but in recent years it has begun producing an increasing amount of original programs which now comprise a third of the schedule. It has programming alliances with popular foreign networks including National Geographic, Discovery Channel and the BBC and a large part of its schedule features recent and past-years documentaries. There is also a Greek dubbed BBC World News news bulletin following the station's own news bulletin and a news-themed morning show.

Skai TV also shows some friendly matches of Panathinaikos FC which are not on any of the Premium Services (Either Cosmote Sport or Nova Sports).

Skai HD
The Skai broadcasts in high definition from the Cosmote TV platform and online. In August 2014, it announced that it will broadcast a new TV channel in HD on digital terrestrial television. It was expected to be launched in early-2015, but it was eventually launched on 27 February 2016.

Skai International
In 2013, Skai TV expanded its service into North America, entering into programming supply agreements with local broadcasters. It launched in the United States via a partnership with local Greek broadcaster New Greek TV, which is available on Time Warner Cable in New York. On December 12, 2013, Skai launched in Canada on Bell Fibe TV via a partnership with ethnic broadcaster Ethnic Channels Group. As of 2016, Skai programming is no longer available in North America.

Logos

See also
Skai 100.3
Skai Group

References

External links
Official Site 

Skai Group
Television networks in Greece
Television channels in Greece
Greek-language television stations
Television channels and stations established in 2006
2006 establishments in Greece
Mass media in Athens